The North Athletic Complex is a softball and soccer venue in Pittsburgh, Pennsylvania, United States. It is home to the Robert Morris Colonials softball and soccer teams of the NCAA Division I Northeast Conference. The venue has a capacity of 500.

The student recreation and fitness center is also located at the North Athletic Complex.

References 

College soccer venues in the United States
Soccer venues in Pennsylvania
Softball venues in Pittsburgh
Sports venues in Pittsburgh
Robert Morris Colonials
Sports venues completed in 1998
1998 establishments in Pennsylvania